Martijn may refer to:

 Martijn (given name), a Dutch given name (including a list of people with the name)
 Vereniging Martijn, a defunct Dutch association that advocated the acceptance of pedophilia and legalization of sexual relationships between adults and children